The Armenian records in swimming are the fastest ever performances of swimmers from Armenia, which are recognised and ratified by the Water Kind Sports Association & Swimming Federation of Armenia.

All records were set in finals unless noted otherwise.

Long Course (50 m)

Men

Women

Mixed relay

Short Course (25 m)

Men

Women

Mixed relay

References

Armenia
Records
Swimming
Swimming